WFDU (89.1 MHz branded as 89.1 WFDU) is a non-commercial, college radio station licensed to Fairleigh Dickinson University in Teaneck, New Jersey.  Founded in 1971, WFDU's studios are on campus, with its transmitter on the Armstrong Tower in Alpine, New Jersey. Following negotiations with New York University and the Federal Communications Commission, an agreement was reached for the two Universities to share the 89.1 frequency on the FM band. While WFDU and WNYU-FM share the frequency, each station maintains separate transmitter and studio facilities as well as discrete programming and personnel.

The station's broadcast signal has up to a 60-mile radius of its transmitter, within the historic Armstrong Field Lab in Alpine. The AFL is the site of the world's first FM station, W2XMN, built by the creator of FM technology, Major Edwin Howard Armstrong. With an increase in antenna height and a power rise to 3,000 watts, WFDU-FM has the potential to reach 8.2 million people. In August 2015, WFDU launched two new HD channels: HD2, which is called "Jazz & What's More" for Jazz music, and HD3, which is called "Masterworks" for Classical music.

History 
WFDU began broadcasting to the New York region at 12:00 August 30, 1971 and became a laboratory for students of Fairleigh Dickinson University to learn practical broadcasting. WFDU shares 89.1 FM with WNYU and can only broadcast 50% of the week. However, the station is available online all of the time. The stream is carried by several apps and websites including iHeartRadio, iTunes Radio, TuneIn.com, and the WFDU (FM) website, wfdu.fm.

Programming
The station exclusively music, and provides quite a range including blues, country/bluegrass music, retro radio, eclectic, folk, gospel, oldies rock and soul/R&B.

Blues
Blues musician Big Frank Mirra hosts "Blues on the Run" on Tuesdays with former blues radio producer, Music Director of Blues/Roots/American. Dennis Gruenling is the host of "Blues & The Beat," spinning everything from the legends of Chicago-style blues like Muddy Waters, the jump blues styles of Joe Liggins, New Orleans blues of Fats Domino, and vocal blues and R&B from the likes of The Spiders every Thursday. 'Friday Night Live' focuses on blues and blues-based music.

RetroRadio
RetroRadio features popular music programming for those born from the late 1940s onwards. It focuses on music released between 1960 and 1975. Hosts have included: former 1010 WINS news anchor Judy DeAngelis, general manager Duff Sheffield, country music host Kenny O'Boyle, Brian Norton, E.B. Fisher, Jimy Bleu, Ghosty, and Ed Alstrom.

Country/bluegrass
Richard Haas hosts "Bluegrass & Beyond." Kenny O'Boyle hosts 'Let There Be Country'" Tuesdays and Thursdays.

Eclectic
Lise Avery began broadcasting her show, "Anything Goes!!" from WFDU in 1998, which features a fun, unpredictable mix of standards, jazz & classic pop with a bit of almost anything else. Rob DeScherer started at WFDU in 1990 with his show "Crescent City Roadhouse," featuring the best blend of Music America Blues, Country, & Singer/Songwriter Folk, with a special accent on Cajun & Zydeco music.

Evan Toth is the host of "The Sharp Notes" which features interviews with a wide variety of artists and performers across multiple genres. Paul Butler has been with WFDU since 1985 hosting The Imagination Parade, a blend of stories, songs, and sometimes contests and prizes for kids and the families who love them. Recently, he also started hosting another kids show called, 'Kids Cross Roads'. Bill Shibilski, even after a decade in retirement, is back with Polka Party every Sunday evening. Vicki Solá has been hosting Que Viva La Música for over 30 years now and she has been associated with WFDU (FM) since 1981. Andres Padua aka “Mr. Hard Salsa,” a contributor to Que Viva La Música since 2012, and a regular on the show since May 2013, has come on board officially as co-host with Vicki Solá for Que Viva La Música. "THE MIGHTY ORGAN", hosted by noted organist Ed Alstrom features the rarely heard sound of the mid-century pop organ, by some of the greatest organists ever: Ethel Smith, Lenny Dee, Klaus Wunderlich, Jesse Crawford, Eddie Layton, John Kiley, Don Baker, George Wright, and many more, from a time when the organ was justifiably called "The King of Instruments".

"TABLETALK" was hosted from its inception by Bill Hahn.  The program focused on conversations with authors, performance artists, and people of political and cultural interest.  It ceased airing when Bill Hahn was summarily ousted by the new mgmt. of the station (Barry Sheffield)

Folk
Lynn Crystal has worked at WFDU for sixteen years, making her broadcast debut as the newscaster for Marc Copeland's Jazz Influences and later hosting her show Carnival of Song, which showcases exceptional songwriting and performances. Jerry Treacy is associated with WFDU as the host of Crash on the Levee, an eclectic and unique mix of weekend Music America.

Ron Olesko, a graduate from FDU began WFDU's now-longest-running show, “Traditions” in 1980. The Traditions show is a mix of folk music that is not only traditional but modern and meaningful, incorporating much thematic material."Traditions" has also been co-hosted by various others.   The last one was Bill Hahn for 24 yrs.  See below for more commentary on that.

Bill Hahn had hosted this program for some 24 yrs. until being forced out by Barry Sheffield (mgr.)and Ron Olesko .

Gospel
Tony Smith has been working at WFDU for 11 years, hosting his show "Gospel Jazzations," focusing on the jazz/instrumental side of gospel music. He's also a gospel jazz saxophonist playing this special brand of music across the world. DJ D-Real is the host of Gospel Housing Authority, which features Gospel music in its many forms: Gospel Rap, R&P (Rhythm and praise), Contemporary, Traditional, and Club. "DJ Frankie Vibe" is an Inspirational/Soulful House Mix Show. Floyd Cray is the host of "New Song Radio," with music that is beautifully composed melodies that touch the spirit of people across the world. Sharon Addison has been with WFDU since 2008, hosting Spotlight on Gospel and taking her listeners island-hopping in different rhythms and languages with Caribbean & World Gospel music. Anita Elaine Rivers and Eric Johnson, known as Min. EJ host “The Sound of Victory.”

Oldies/rock 
Boomers is a music preservation program, hosted by Brian Norton dedicated to keeping the music of the baby boomers era alive. John is a lifelong Jersey boy, and a graduate of FDU ('82). He's also a former DJ and Music Director at WFDU. John has worked in various jobs in the Music Biz for 25 years, working as a DJ in several clubs including Hitsville, The Blue Willow, and Loop Lounge. Big Al has worked with WFDU for 30 years. Allyson is now the host of "On the Fence With Ally Cat," bringing the sounds of the ‘70s and ‘80s. Steve Nicholas, hosts “Ride the Wave.” Shaun McGann hosts "The Seven to Ten" on Saturday nights, a rock-based program that organically incorporates modern and classic rock, along with jazz, hip-hop, blues, and pop into its mix. "Uncle Floyd's Garage Sale Music" is a mix of what might be in someone's eclectic collection of LPs, 78s, 45s, etc. that might have been found at any garage sale over the last few decades. Ghosty spins top hits and lost gems from the mid-1950s to the mid-1960s on his show, “The Vintage Rock & Pop Shop.”

Soul/R&B 
Dan's Old School consists mostly of old-school blues, R&B, rock n’ roll, and rocking jazz, with a tip of the hat to the venues where he saw Muddy Waters, Lightnin’ Hopkins, Stevie Wonder, Solomon Burke, Champion Jack Dupree, the folks name above, and many more. Ed Alstrom hosts the "GOT SOUL?" program. Regular segments include Artist, Album, and/or Record Label of the Week, ‘White Guys’ that ‘got soul’, and special events like Soul Dance Parties. Christine Vitale has been with WFDU since 1996, first as a newscaster and then in 2003 hosting The Group Harmony Alley, which features vocal group music and doo-wop. On Christine's “Rhythm, Rock ‘n Blues Rollercoaster,” it's the spinning of classic and avante garde vocal group harmony sounds, plus the featuring of current and lesser-known artists, many of whom perform on the live music scene today. Terry the Jaguar is the host of Soul 2 Neosoul Experience and plays everything that's grooving be it blue-eyed-soul, brown-eyed-soul, Euro-soul or soul fusion.

References

External links
 

 FCC History Cards for WFDU (1971-1981)

FDU
Radio stations established in 1971
Teaneck, New Jersey